Costner is a surname of several individuals, as well the surname of several fictional characters as well.

 Brandon Costner (born 1987), basketball player
 Chris Costner Sizemore (1927–2016), multiple personality disorder sufferer
 George Costner (1923—2002), boxer
 Kevin Costner (born 1955), actor and director
 Michael Costner, fictional character

Occupational surnames
ru:Костнер